Terrence Scammell may refer to:

 Terrence Scammell (British actor), born 1937
 Terrence Scammell (Canadian actor), born 1958